The Boundary may refer to:

 The Boundary (2014 film), a Chinese suspense action crime drama film
 The Boundary, a 2020 Bangladeshi drama film also known as Gondi
 The Boundary (shopping centre), a retail shopping centre in Auckland, New Zealand
 Boundary, Derbyshire, a former civil parish in Derbyshire, England called "The Boundary"

See also 
 Boundary (disambiguation)